Renbygda is the administrative centre of the municipality of Holtålen in Trøndelag county, Norway. The western part of the village area, near the Ålen Church, is also known simply as Ålen.

Flood
On 15 August 2011, the village area experienced a big flood. This was the largest flood since 1940. The village centre as well as the nearby village of Aunegrenda were both affected. The flood arrived during the night and consequently some people woke up trapped in their homes. A rescue helicopter was used to aid people to safety. The river flowed over all the bridges, and made it impossible to cross with any vehicle. Additionally, the only suspension bridge in the area was twisted, deemed impassable and later rebuilt. Moreover, the municipality had invested a large sum of money in a new football court (which was only two days from opening) which was ruined by the river. In the wake of the flood, the area received money from the Norwegian government in aid to help rebuild the village area.

References

Holtålen
Villages in Trøndelag